The Naute Dam is a dam outside of Keetmanshoop in the ǁKaras Region of Namibia. It was built by Concor between 1970 and 1972 and was officially commissioned in September 1972. It is the third largest dam in Namibia after Hardap Dam to Naute's north and holds up to 69 million cubic metres of water. The dam's source is the Löwen River, a tributary of the Fish River.

Business
Naute Dam supplies potable water to Keetmanshoop and some surrounding farms but is predominantly used for irrigation. It has been consistently underutilised and is one of few dams in Namibia that are often filled to capacity.

The Naute Aqua Fish Farms Project, a government-owned fish farm, is based at the dam.

Naute Fruit Farm is also located at the Naute Dam. The farm primarily grows dates for export to Europe. In 2009, the farm was projected to export 180 tonnes of dates, up from 120 the year before. As of March 2009, the farm employed 76 full-time employees and 250 seasonal workers.

Pictures

References

Dams in Namibia
Keetmanshoop
Dams completed in 1972
1972 establishments in South West Africa
Buildings and structures in ǁKaras Region